Presidential elections were held in Croatia in January 2000, the third since independence in 1991. They were also the first early presidential elections, as they were held due to the death of incumbent president Franjo Tuđman on 10 December 1999, as well as being the last elections held under the semi-presidential system of government, by which the President was the most powerful official in the government structure and could appoint and dismiss the Prime Minister and their cabinet.

As no candidate received the required majority (50%+1 vote of the valid votes cast) in the first round on 24 January, a second round was held on 7 February, the first time a second round had been required in the country's history. The result was a victory for Stjepan Mesić of the Croatian People's Party, who received 56.01% of the vote. Voter turnout was 62.98% in the first round and 60.88% in the second round.

Mesić was inaugurated for a five-year term as the second president of Croatia on 18 February 2000 at St Mark's Square in front of the justices of the Constitutional Court.

Results

First round results by county

Second round results by county

References

Presidential elections in Croatia
Croatia
2000 in Croatia
January 2000 events in Europe
February 2000 events in Europe
2000 elections in Croatia
Modern history of Croatia